Ketelä is a Finnish surname. Notable people with the surname include:

Martti Ketelä (1944–2002), Finnish modern pentathlete
Toni Ketelä (born 1988), Finnish cross country skier

Finnish-language surnames